is a Japanese web manga series written and illustrated by Rakure Umagome. It has been serialized on Kodansha's YanMaga Web since January 2021.

Publication
Written and illustrated by Rakure Umagome, Hajirau Kimi ga Mitainda started on Kodansha's YanMaga Web on January 15, 2021. Kodansha has collected its chapters into individual tankōbon volumes. The first volume was released on July 19, 2021. As of July 20, 2022, four volumes have been released.

The manga has been licensed in France by Ono.

Volume list

References

External links
  

Japanese webcomics
Kodansha manga
Seinen manga
Webcomics in print